Mark Reid (born 15 September 1961) is a Scottish retired professional footballer who played as a left back. Reid made over 350 appearances in the Scottish and English Football Leagues between 1980 and 1993.

Career
Born in Kilwinning, Reid played League football for Celtic, Charlton Athletic and St Mirren before retiring in 1993 due to injury.

References

1961 births
Living people
People from Kilwinning
Footballers from North Ayrshire
Scottish footballers
Scotland under-21 international footballers
Association football fullbacks
Celtic F.C. players
Charlton Athletic F.C. players
St Mirren F.C. players
Scottish Football League players
English Football League players